Opiter Verginius Tricostus served as consul of the early Roman Republic in 502 BC, with Spurius Cassius Vecellinus. He was the first from the powerful Verginia family to obtain the consulship.

Together with his colleague Spurius Cassius Vecellinus, Verginius Tricostus fought against the Aurunci, and took Pometia. Livy also says that the consuls celebrated a triumph for their victory, however the Fasti Triumphales record only one triumph, by Cassius.

He is listed in an incomplete text by Festus as numbering among the nine patricians burned in 486 BC for conspiring with his former consular colleague Cassius. Considering that this would have occurred during Opiter's son, Proculus, consulship, this narrative remains highly uncertain.

The filiation of a number of consular men in the following generation suggests they were Opiter Verginius' sons.  They are: Proculus Verginius Tricostus Rutilus (consul 486 BC), Titus Verginius Tricostus Rutilus (consul 479 BC), Opiter Verginius Tricostus Esquilinus (consul 478 BC) and Aulus Verginius Tricostus Rutilus (consul 476 BC).

See also
Verginia gens

References 

6th-century BC Roman consuls
5th-century BC Romans
6th-century BC births
5th-century BC deaths
Tricostus, Opiter